Tomić is a common family name found in Croatia, Serbia, Montenegro and Bosnia and Herzegovina. It is sometimes transliterated as Tomic or Tomich outside these areas.  

It is the second most common surname in the Primorje-Gorski Kotar County of Croatia, and among the most frequent ones in two other counties.

The name is a patronymic based on the given names Tomislav and Toma, names cognate to English Thomas.

Notable people with the surname include:

Aleksandra Tomić (born 1969), Serbian politician 
Ante Tomić (born 1970), Croatian writer
Ante Tomić (born 1987), Croatian basketball player
Ante Tomić (born 1983), Croatian football player
Bernard Tomic (born 1992), German-born Australian tennis player of Bosnian and Croatian origin
Boban Tomić (born 1988), Slovenian basketball player
Bojan Tomić (born 1983), Bosnian football player
Danica Tomić (1905–1961), Serbian aviator
Dario Tomić (born 1987), Bosnian Croat football player
Đorđe Tomić (born 1972), former Serbian football player
Dragan Tomić (1936–2022), Serbian politician
Duško Tomić (1958–2017), Serbian football manager and former player
Fabjan Tomić (born 1995), Croatian football player
Goran Tomić (born 1977), Croatian football manager and former player
Ivan Tomić (born 1976), Serbian football manager and former player
Jaša Tomić (1856–1922), Serbian politician and publisher
Josephine Tomic (born 1989), Australian cyclist
Josip Eugen Tomić (1843–1906), Croatian writer
Jovan Tomić (1869–1932), Serbian historian
Kristina Tomić (born 1995), Croatian taekwondo practitioner
Mario Tomić (born 1988), Croatian handball player
Marko Tomić (born 1991), Serbian football player
Mijat Tomić (died 1656), a Croatian hajduk
Milan Tomić (born 1973), former Serbian-Greek basketball player
Milivoje Tomić (1920–2000), Serbian actor
Miloš Tomić (born 1980), Serbian rower
Mimoza Nestorova-Tomić (born 1929), Macedonian architect and urban planner
Miodrag Tomić (1888–1962), Serbian aviator
Nemanja Tomić (born 1988), Serbian football player
Novak Tomić (1936–2003), Serbian football player
Obrad Tomić (born 1993), Bosnian basketball player
Petar Tomić (born 1982), Croatian football player
Predrag Tomić (born 1953), Serbian football player
Radomiro Tomic (1914–1992), Chilean politician of Croatian origin
Sandro Tomić (born 1972), Croatian football player
Sara Tomic (born 1998), Australian tennis player, sister of Bernard
Tomislav Tomić (born 1990), Bosnian football player of Croatian origin
Vjekoslav Tomić (born 1983), Croatian football player
Vladan Tomić (1967–2016), Cypriot football player
Vukašin Tomić (born 1987), Serbian football player
Živorad Tomić (born 1951), Croatian film director
Zoran Tomić (footballer) (born 1989), Bosnian football player

See also
Jaša Tomić, Sečanj, a town in Serbia named after Jaša Tomić
Radomiro Tomić mine, a copper mine in Chile, named after Radomir Tomic
Tomić Psalter, a 14th-century Bulgarian psalter discovered in 1901

References

Croatian surnames
Serbian surnames
Patronymic surnames
Surnames from given names